Neil Spencer Leeks (born 10 September 1959) is a British former motorcycle speedway rider who rode for Mildenhall Fen Tigers and Leicester Lions.

Born in Ipswich, Leeks made his debut in the National League for Mildenhall in 1976. In 1977 he established himself as a regular member of the Mildenhall Team and the following season also rode in the British League on loan to Leicester Lions, where he averaged just over three points from six matches. Leeks represented England at National League level in 1977 against Australasia, scoring ten points in the fifth Test at Mildenhall. Injury hampered his riding and he retired at the end of the 1978 season.

References

1959 births
Living people
British speedway riders
English motorcycle racers
Sportspeople from Ipswich
Mildenhall Fen Tigers riders
Leicester Lions riders